Güzelyurt Sub-district is a sub-district of Güzelyurt District, Northern Cyprus.

References 

Güzelyurt District (Northern Cyprus)